Bismuth titanate or bismuth titanium oxide is a solid inorganic compound of bismuth, titanium and oxygen with the chemical formula of Bi12TiO20,
Bi 4Ti3O12 or Bi2Ti2O7.

Synthesis
Bismuth titanate ceramics can be produced by heating a mixture of bismuth and titanium oxides. Bi12TiO20 forms at 730–850 °C, and melts when the temperature is raised above 875 °C, decomposing in the melt to Bi4Ti3O12 and Bi2O3. Millimeter-sized single crystals of Bi12TiO20 can be grown by the Czochralski process, from the molten phase at 880–900 °C.

Properties and applications
Bismuth titanates exhibit electrooptical effect and photorefractive effect, that is, a reversible change in the refractive index under applied electric field or illumination, respectively. Consequently, they have potential applications in reversible recording media for real-time holography or image processing applications.

See also
Bismuth germanate
Sillénite

References

Titanates
Bismuth compounds
Ceramic materials
Piezoelectric materials
Ferroelectric materials
B